Muhamed Bešić (born 10 September 1992) is a Bosnian professional footballer who plays as a defensive midfielder for Nemzeti Bajnokság I club Ferencváros and the Bosnia and Herzegovina national team.

Bešić started his professional career at Hamburger SV, playing mainly in its reserve team, before joining Ferencváros in 2012. Two years later, he moved to Everton, who loaned him to Middlesbrough in 2018 and to Sheffield United in 2019. He went back to Ferencváros in 2021.

A former youth international for Bosnia and Herzegovina, Bešić made his senior international debut in 2010, earning over 40 caps since. He represented the nation at their first major championship, the 2014 FIFA World Cup.

Club career

Early career
Bešić started playing football at local clubs, before joining Hamburger SV's youth academy in 2009. He made his professional debut against Borussia Dortmund on 12 November 2010 at the age of 18.

In August 2012, he moved to Hungarian team Ferencváros. On 5 May 2013, he scored his first professional goal against Debrecen.

Everton
In July 2014, Bešić was transferred to English side Everton for an undisclosed fee, speculated to be in the region of €5 million.

2014–15 season
He made his official debut for the club on 30 August in a loss to Chelsea. On 27 September, he started his first game for Everton against biggest rivals Liverpool.

2015–16 season
In July 2015, Bešić picked up a hamstring injury during pre-season game against Swindon Town, which ruled him out for the start of season. He made his season debut in EFL Cup game against Barnsley on 26 August.

In February 2016, he was voted Everton's Player of the Month for January.

In March, he extended his contract until June 2021.

Bešić's season was marked by hamstring injuries, which limited his playing time and appearances. Alongside the one picked up during pre-season, he had two more, in both legs.

2016–17 season
In July 2016, Bešić changed his shirt number from 17 he wore for previous two seasons to 21.

In August, he suffered a severe knee injury, which was diagnosed as anterior cruciate ligament tear and was ruled out for at least six months. He began with light training in late December, and he was given medical all-clear in March 2017. However, he did not play any official games for Everton until the end of season.

2017–18 season
Bešić returned to the pitch on 17 August in UEFA Europa League play-offs against Hajduk Split, over a year after the injury.

In February 2018, Bešić was loaned to Championship outfit Middlesbrough until the end of season. He made his competitive debut for the team on 17 February against Cardiff City. On 21 April, he scored his first goal for Middlesbrough in a triumph over Derby County.

2018–19 season
In August, his loan to Middlesbrough was extended for an additional season. He made his season debut on 24 August against West Bromwich Albion. On 2 October, he scored his first goal of the campaign in a defeat of Ipswich Town.

2019–20 season
In August 2019, Bešić was sent on a season-long to Sheffield United. He debuted officially for the team in EFL Cup game against Blackburn Rovers on 27 August. Two months later, he made his league debut against West Ham United. On 25 January 2020, he scored his first goal for Sheffield United in FA Cup tie against Millwall.

2020–21 season
In spite of not being registered for Premier League games, Bešić decided to stay at Everton until the end of his contract. In February 2021, team manager Carlo Ancelotti decided to include him in the squad list for domestic games. Nevertheless, he finished the season not having played a single game and was released by the club.

Return to Ferencváros
In September, Bešić returned to Ferencváros on a multi-year deal. On 22 September, he played his first competitive game for the team since coming back against Fehérvár. He won his first trophy with the club after returning on 24 April 2022, when they were crowned league champions. On 29 April, he scored first goal for Ferencváros since his comeback in a victory over Paks.

In February 2023, he again ruptured his anterior cruciate ligament and was shut down for at least half a year.

International career

Bešić was a member of Bosnia and Herzegovina under-21 team for several years.

In November 2010, he received his first senior call-up, for a friendly game against Slovakia, and debuted in that game on 17 November. He thereby became the youngest player to ever play for Bosnia and Herzegovina at senior level, breaking the previous record held by Miralem Pjanić.

In June 2014, Bešić was named in Bosnia and Herzegovina's squad for 2014 FIFA World Cup, country's first major competition. He made his tournament debut in the opening group match against Argentina on 15 June.

Style of play
During his career, Bešić has been deployed as a right-back and as a centre-back, although his natural position in his own words is defensive midfielder.

He was described by then Everton manager Roberto Martínez as a "very complete footballer", who "has got a very natural balance about knowing that he can be strong and aggressive but in the same way he's a technical player on the ball."

Personal life
Bešić has three children with his long-time girlfriend Jessica, two daughters and one son.

He is a practising Muslim; along with international teammates Ibrahim Šehić, Armin Hodžić, Izet Hajrović, Sead Kolašinac, Edin Višća and Ervin Zukanović he visited a mosque in Zenica during national team concentration.

Bešić has many tattoos, his first being the word Bosanac (Bosnian). Some of many are also names of his parents and brother.

Career statistics

Club

International

Honours
Ferencváros
Nemzeti Bajnokság I: 2021–22
Magyar Kupa: 2021–22
Ligakupa: 2012–13

References

External links

1992 births
Living people
Footballers from Berlin
German people of Bosnia and Herzegovina descent
Citizens of Bosnia and Herzegovina through descent
Bosnia and Herzegovina footballers
Bosnia and Herzegovina under-21 international footballers
Bosnia and Herzegovina international footballers
Bosnia and Herzegovina expatriate footballers
Association football midfielders
Hamburger SV II players
Hamburger SV players
Ferencvárosi TC footballers
Everton F.C. players
Middlesbrough F.C. players
Sheffield United F.C. players
Regionalliga players
Bundesliga players
Nemzeti Bajnokság I players
Premier League players
English Football League players
Expatriate footballers in Hungary
Expatriate footballers in England
Bosnia and Herzegovina expatriate sportspeople in Germany
Bosnia and Herzegovina expatriate sportspeople in Hungary
Bosnia and Herzegovina expatriate sportspeople in England
2014 FIFA World Cup players